The 130th Pennsylvania House of Representatives District is located in Southeastern Pennsylvania and has been represented since 2011 by David M. Maloney.

District profile
The 130th Pennsylvania House of Representatives District is located within Berks County. It includes the Rhoads Opera House and the Hartman Cider Press. It is made up of the following areas:
Berks County
 Amity Township
 Bally
 Bechtelsville
 Birdsboro
 Boyertown
 Colebrookdale Township
 District Township
 Douglass Township
 Earl Township
 Exeter Township (PART, Precincts 02, 04, 06, 08 and 10)
 Oley Township
 Pike Township
 Union Township
 Washington Township

Representatives

Recent election results

References

External links
District Map from the United States Census Bureau
Pennsylvania House Legislative District Maps from the Pennsylvania Redistricting Commission.  
Population Data for District 130 from the Pennsylvania Redistricting Commission.

Government of Berks County, Pennsylvania
130